Archery at the 2011 Island Games was held from 27–30 June 2011 at the Newclose County Cricket Ground in the Isle of Wight, England.

Events

Medal table

Men

Women

Team

References
Archery at the 2011 Island Games

2011 Island Games
2011 in archery
2011
2011 in English sport
International archery competitions hosted by the United Kingdom